Caulk boots or calk boots (also called cork boots, timber boots, logger boots, logging boots, or corks) are a form of rugged footwear that are most often associated with the timber industry but are also worn regularly for hiking and in industries such as manufacturing and construction, owing to their safety features.

Caulk boots are typically made of leather or rubber uppers extending over the ankle, with a thick rubber sole to provide protection, and bearing steel spikes for traction.

See also

Shoe studs (disambiguation)

References

External links
Article about logging boots

Logging
Oregon culture
Boots